Kudagu (Dargwa: Ккудау) is a rural locality (a selo) and the administrative centre of Kudaginsky Selsoviet, Dakhadayevsky District, Republic of Dagestan, Russia. The population was 561 as of 2010. There are 7 streets.

Geography
Kudagu is located 12 km southeast of Urkarakh (the district's administrative centre) by road. Zilbachi and Zubanchi are the nearest rural localities.

Nationalities 
Dargins live there.

References 

Rural localities in Dakhadayevsky District